Necrophilus is a genus of primitive carrion beetles in the family Agyrtidae. There are at least three described species in Necrophilus.

Species
These three species belong to the genus Necrophilus:
 Necrophilus hydrophiloides Guérin-Méneville, 1835 (flat brown scavenger beetle)
 Necrophilus pettiti Horn, 1880 (small scavenger beetle)
 Necrophilus subterraneus (Dahl, 1807)

References

Further reading

External links

 

Staphylinoidea
Articles created by Qbugbot